Chase Twichell (born August 20, 1950) is an American poet, professor, publisher, and, in 1999, the founder of Ausable Press. Her most recent poetry collection is Things as It Is (Copper Canyon Press, 2018). Horses Where the Answers Should Have Been  (Copper Canyon Press, 2010) earned her Claremont Graduate University's prestigious $100,000 Kingsley Tufts Poetry Award. She is the winner of several awards in writing from the New Jersey State Council on the Arts, the American Academy of Arts and Letters and The Artists Foundation.  Additionally, she has received fellowships from both the Guggenheim Foundation and the National Endowment for the Arts. Her poems have appeared in literary journals and magazines including The New Yorker, Field, Ploughshares, The Georgia Review, The Paris Review, Poetry, The Nation, and The Yale Review.

Many of Twichell's poems are heavily influenced by her years as a Zen Buddhist student of John Daido Loori at Zen Mountain Monastery, and her poetry in the book The Snow Watcher shows it. She attended the Foote School in New Haven. In the Fall 2003 Tricycle magazine interview with Chase, she says, "Zazen and poetry are both studies of the mind. I find the internal pressure exerted by emotion and by a koan to be similar in surprising and unpredictable ways. Zen is a wonderful sieve through which to pour a poem. It strains out whatever's inessential."

Twichell was born in New Haven, Connecticut, and earned her B.A. from Trinity College and her M.F.A. from the Iowa Writers' Workshop. She was married to novelist Russell Banks from 1989 until his death in 2023. She has taught at Princeton University, Warren Wilson College, Goddard College, University of Alabama, and Hampshire College.

Twichell was a judge for the 2011 Griffin Poetry Prize.

Bibliography

Poetry 
Collections

 The Odds (University of Pittsburgh Press, 1986)
 Perdido (Farrar, Straus & Giroux, 1991)
 The Ghost of Eden (Ontario Review Press, 1995)
 The Snow Watcher (Ontario Review Press, 1998)
 Dog Language (Copper Canyon Press, 2005)
 Horses Where the Answers Should Have Been (Copper Canyon Press, 2010)
 Things as It Is (Copper Canyon Press, 2018)
List of poems

Anthologies edited
 The Practice of Poetry: Writing Exercises From Poets Who Teach (edited with Robin Behn: HarperPerennial, 1992)
Translations
 The Lover of God, Poems by Rabindranath Tagore (Copper Canyon Press, 2003) (translated with Tony K. Stewart)

References

External links
 Author Biography: PoetryNet > August 1998 > Chase Twichell
 Poem: The Poetry Foundation > Self-Portrait by Chase Twichell
 Poems & Bio: Blackbird > Chase Twichell
 Perceiving human consciousness through award-winning poetry Hartford Trinity College Mosaic

1950 births
Living people
American women poets
Poets from New York (state)
Poets from Connecticut
National Endowment for the Arts Fellows
American Zen Buddhists
Iowa Writers' Workshop alumni
University of Iowa alumni
Trinity College (Connecticut) alumni
The New Yorker people
20th-century American women writers
21st-century American women writers